Miyaji is a Japanese surname that may refer to
Atsuko Miyaji, Japanese cryptographer and number theorist
Katsuhiko Miyaji (born 1971), Japanese baseball outfielder
Kazuaki Miyaji  (born 1940), Japanese politician 
Mao Miyaji (born 1984), Japanese actress
Masayuki Miyaji (born 1976), Japanese anime director and supervisor 
Takeshi Miyaji (1965–2011), Japanese video game developer
Toshio Miyaji, Japanese football player
Yoshihisa Miyaji (born 1973), Japanese weightlifter 
Yōsuke Miyaji (born 1987), Japanese football player 

Japanese-language surnames